Huntly, Strathbogie and Howe of Alford is one of the nineteen wards used to elect members of the Aberdeenshire Council. It elects four Councillors.

Councillors

Election Results

2022 Election
2022 Aberdeenshire Council election

Robbie Withey was arrested and charged in relation to a disturbance in Alford on 19 April 2022 and as a result, he was suspended from the Conservative Party. He was therefore no longer a Conservative candidate in the Huntly, Strathbogie and Howe of Alford Ward, however, it was too late to remove him from the ballot paper. He was subsequently returned as an Independent Councillor for the ward at the election.

2017 Election
2017 Aberdeenshire Council election

2012 Election
2012 Aberdeenshire Council election

2007 Election
2007 Aberdeenshire Council election

References

Wards of Aberdeenshire